The 2015 Junior World Fencing Championships were held in Tashkent, Uzbekistan at the Tashkent Tennis Centre from 5 to 9 April.

Medal summary

Men's events

Women's events

Medal table

References
 Tashkent2015.uz, official website of the competition
 Detailed results on fencingworldwide.com

Junior World Fencing Championships
2015 in fencing
International sports competitions hosted by Uzbekistan
2015 in Uzbekistani sport
Sport in Tashkent
21st century in Tashkent